Byron was an electoral district of the Legislative Assembly in the Australian state of New South Wales created in 1913, replacing Rous, and named after Cape Byron. With the introduction of proportional representation in 1920, Byron absorbed Lismore and Clarence and elected three members. With the end of proportional representation in 1927, it was redivided into the single-member electorates of Byron, Lismore and Clarence. In 1988, Byron was replaced by Ballina and Murwillumbah.

Members for Byron

Election results

References

Former electoral districts of New South Wales
Constituencies established in 1913
Constituencies disestablished in 1988
1913 establishments in Australia
1988 disestablishments in Australia